The canton of Hendaye-Côte Basque-Sud (before 2015: Canton of Hendaye) is an administrative division in southern France. At the French canton reorganisation which came into effect in March 2015, the canton was renamed and reduced from 4 to 3 communes:
Biriatou
Hendaye
Urrugne

See also
Cantons of the Pyrénées-Atlantiques department

References

Cantons of Pyrénées-Atlantiques